John "Jack" Ashby (1707–1789) was a Colonel in the Virginia Militia.

During the French and Indian war there was a siege at present day Fort Ashby, West Virginia. In 1756 John Ashby was out of the fort at that location and was attacked by Indians and made a remarkable escape to the fort. The fort was named for him Fort Ashby

References

People from Mineral County, West Virginia
People from Virginia
1707 births
1789 deaths